A math circle is a learning space where participants engage in the depths and intricacies of mathematical thinking, propagate the culture of doing mathematics, and create knowledge. To reach these goals, participants partake in problem-solving, mathematical modeling, the practice of art, and philosophical discourse. Some circles involve competition, while others do not.

Characteristics

Math circles can have a variety of styles. Some are very informal, with the learning proceeding through games, stories, or hands-on activities. Others are more traditional enrichment classes but without formal examinations. Some have a strong emphasis on preparing for Olympiad competitions; some avoid competition as much as possible. Models can use any combination of these techniques, depending on the audience, the mathematician, and the environment of the circle. Athletes have sports teams through which to deepen their involvement with sports; math circles can play a similar role for kids who like to think. Two features all math circles have in common are (1) that they are composed of students who want to be there - either like math, or want to like math, and (2) that they give students a social context in which to enjoy mathematics.

History
Mathematical enrichment activities in the United States have been around since sometime before 1977, in the form of residential summer programs, math contests, and local school-based programs. The concept of a math circle, on the other hand, with its emphasis on convening professional mathematicians and secondary school students regularly to solve problems, appeared in the U.S. in 1994 with Robert and Ellen Kaplan at Harvard University. This form of mathematical outreach made its way to the U.S. most directly from the former Soviet Union and present-day Russia and Bulgaria. They first appeared in the Soviet Union during the 1930s; they have existed in Bulgaria since sometime before 1907. The tradition arrived in the U.S. with émigrés who had received their inspiration from math circles as teenagers. Many of them successfully climbed the academic ladder to secure positions within universities, and a few pioneers among them decided to initiate math circles within their communities to preserve the tradition which had been so pivotal in their own formation as mathematicians.  These days, math circles frequently partner with other mathematical education organizations, such as CYFEMAT: The International Network of Math Circles and Festivals, the Julia Robinson Mathematics Festival ,and the Mandelbrot Competition.

Content choices
Decisions about content are difficult for newly forming math circles and clubs, or for parents seeking groups for their children.

'Project-based clubs may spend a few meetings building origami, developing a math trail in their town, or programming a math-like computer game together. Math-rich projects may be artistic, exploratory, applied to sciences, executable (software-based), business-oriented, or directed at fundamental contributions to local communities. Museums, cultural and business clubs, tech groups, online networks, artists/musicians/actors active in the community, and other individual professionals can make math projects especially real and meaningful. Increasingly, math clubs invite remote participation of active people (authors, community leaders, professionals) through webinars and teleconferencing software.

Problem-solving circles get together to pose and solve interesting, deep, meaningful math problems. Problems considered "good" are easy to pose, challenging to solve, require connections among several concepts and techniques, and lead to significant math ideas. Best problem-solving practices include meta-cognition (managing memory and attention), grouping problems by type and conceptual connections (e.g. "river crossing problems"), moving between more general and abstract problems and particular, simpler examples, and collaboration with other club members, with current online communities, and with past mathematicians through the media they contributed to the culture.

Guided exploration circles use self-discovery and the Socratic method to probe deep questions. Robert & Ellen Kaplan, in their book Out of the Labyrinth: Setting Mathematics Free, make a case for this format describing the non-profit Cambridge/Boston Math Circle they founded in 1994 at the Harvard University. The book describes the classroom, organizational and practical issues the Kaplans faced in founding their Math Circle. The meetings encourage a free discussion of ideas; while the content is mathematically rigorous, the atmosphere is friendly and relaxed. The philosophy of the teachers is, "What you have been obliged to discover by yourself leaves a path in your mind which you can use again when the need arises''" (G. C. Lichtenberg). Children are encouraged to ask exploratory questions. Are there numbers between numbers? What's geometry like with no parallel lines? Can you tile a square with squares all of the different sizes?Research mathematicians and connecting students with them can be a focus of math circles. Students in these circles appreciate and start to attain a very special way of thinking in research mathematics, such as generalizing problems, continue asking deeper questions, seeing similarities across different examples and so on.Topic-centered clubs follow math themes such as clock arithmetic, fractals, or linearity. Club members write and read essays, pose and solve problems, create and study definitions, build interesting example spaces, and investigate applications of their current topic. There are lists of time-tested, classic math club topics, especially rich in connections and accessible to a wide range of abilities. The plus of using a classic topic is the variety of resources available from the past; however, bringing a relatively obscure or new topic to the attention of the club and the global community is very rewarding, as well.Applied math clubs''' center on a field other than mathematics, such as math for thespians, computer programming math, or musical math. Such clubs need strong leadership both for the math parts and for the other field part. Such clubs can meet at an artists' studio, at a game design company, at a theater or another authentic professional setting. More examples of fruitful applied math pathways include history, storytelling, art, inventing and tinkering, toy and game design, robotics, origami, and natural sciences.

Most circles and clubs mix some features of the above types. For example, the Metroplex Math Circle  has a combination of problem-solving and research, and the New York Math Circle  is some combination of a problem-solving circle and a topic-centered club, with vestiges of a research circle.

One can expect problem-solving groups to attract kids already strong in math and confident in their math abilities. On the other hand, math anxious kids will be more likely to try project-based or applied clubs. Topic-centered clubs typically work with kids who can all work at about the same level. The decision about the type of the club strongly depends on your target audience.

Competition decisions
Math competitions involve comparing speed, depth, or accuracy of math work among several people or groups. Traditionally, European competitions are more depth-oriented, and Asian and North American competitions are more speed-oriented, especially for younger children. The vast majority of math competitions involve solving closed ended (known answers) problems, however, there are also essay, project and software competitions. As with all tests requiring limited time, the problems focus more on the empirical accuracy and foundations of mathematics work rather than an extension of basic knowledge. More often than not, competition differs entirely from curricular mathematics in requiring creativity in elementary applications—so that although there may be closed answers, it takes significant extension of mathematical creativity in order to successfully achieve the ends.

For people like Robert and Ellen Kaplan, competition carries with it a negative connotation and corollary of greed for victory rather than an appreciation of mathematics. However, those who run math circles centering mostly on competition rather than seminars and lessons attest that this is a large assumption. Rather, participants grow in their appreciation of math via math competitions such as the AMC, AIME, USAMO, and ARML.

Some math circles are completely devoted to preparing teams or individuals for particular competitions. The biggest plus of the competition framework for a circle organizer is the ready-made set of well-defined goals. The competition provides a time and task management structure, and easily defined progress tracking. This is also the biggest minus of competition-based mathematics, because defining goals and dealing with complexity and chaos are important in all real-world endeavors. Competitive math circles attract students who are already strong and confident in mathematics, but also welcome those who wish to engage in the mathematics competitive world. Beyond the age of ten or so, they also attract significantly more males than females, and in some countries, their racial composition is disproportionate to the country's demographic.

Collaborative math clubs are more suitable for kids who are anxious about mathematics, need "math therapy" because of painful past experiences, or want to have more casual and artistic relationships with mathematics. A playgroup or a coop that does several activities together, including a math club, usually chooses collaborative or hybrid models that are more likely to accommodate all members already in the group.

Most math circles and clubs combine some competitive and some collaborative activities. For example, many math circles, while largely centering on competitions, host seasonal tournaments and infuse their competition seminars with fun mathematical lessons.

References

External links

Math circles in United Kingdom 
 Maths Circles by We Solve Problems
 Maths Circles by MESME

Math circles in North America
(listed in alphabetical order, by name)
 "Art of Inquiry" Math Circle for elementary school students in Rockville, MD
 Berkeley Math Circle
 Boise Math Circles
 Círculos Matemáticos at the Institute of Mathematics, UNAM in Mexico City.
 Davis (California) Math Circle at UC Davis
 Florida Math Circle – sponsored by the Florida Student Association of Mathematics
 Fremont Math Circle - California Bay Area
 Girls' Angle in Cambridge, MA
 The Global Math Circle
   Global Math Circle in Toronto, Ontario
 Gunn (California) HS Math Circle
 Harvard Math Circle, Bob & Ellen Kaplan Video of Class Techniques given to The Mathematical Sciences Research Institute
 Lehman College Math Circle in the Bronx
 Los Angeles Math Circle
 Marin Math Circle at the Dominican University of California
 Math Circle at Arizona State University in Tempe
 The Math Circle in Boston
 Math for Love, leading Teacher and Student Math Circles in Seattle, WA
 Metroplex Math Circle at UT Dallas
 Miami Math Circle at Florida International University
 Mid-Cities Math Circle at UT Arlington
 Mobile Math Circle in South Alabama
 New Hampshire Math Circle
 New York Math Circle
 Orange County (California) Math Circle
 Orlando Math Circle
 Palo Alto (California) Math Circle
 Prime Factor Math Circle in Seattle, WA
 Princeton Math Circle
 San Diego Math Circle
 San Francisco Math Circle
 San Jose Math Circle
 Toronto Math Circle
 Tucson Math Circle at The University of Arizona
 Utah Math Circle
 Waterloo Math Circle
 Westchester Area Math Circle at Manhattanville College
 Wyoming Math Circle

Math circles in South America
 Círculo Matemático Kimche (Since 2016) at  Universidad de Los Lagos, Chile

Other
 CYFEMAT – The International Network of Math Circles and Festivals
 MathCompetitions.info – a large database of US national and regional math competitions and classes, with sample questions
 Global Math Circle – an online series of Math Circles
 The IMO Compendium – a large database of competition problems and training materials
 Tom Davis notes on math circle lessons – Notes here are representative of a proper subset of math circles.

Mathematics education
Mathematics competitions